The Nines is a 2007 science fiction psychological thriller film written and directed by John August, starring Ryan Reynolds, Hope Davis, Melissa McCarthy, and Elle Fanning. The film debuted at the 2007 Sundance Film Festival and made $63,165 in the U.S. box office through October 11, 2007.

Narrative structure
The film is broken into three chapters centred around three men (all played by Ryan Reynolds) who try to uncover the secret about strange happenings in their, at times overlapping, lives.

"Part One: The Prisoner"
Gary is a troubled actor who is wearing a green bracelet on his wrist, under house arrest living in another person's house because he burned down his own. The owner of the house is described as a TV writer away on work. While living in the house, he is befriended by both a P.R. "handler", Margaret, and the single mom next door, Sarah, who may or may not be interested in him romantically. Over the course of his house arrest, Gary becomes convinced that he is being haunted by the number nine, including finding a note in his own handwriting saying "Look for the nines". He encounters many occurrences of the number nine: while playing backgammon, he rolls nines; while reading newspaper advertisements, he becomes obsessed with finding nines. Asking Sarah about the number 9 worries her, and she cryptically tells him: "I can get you out of here". He sees different versions of himself around the house, which unsettles him, causing him to break out of his house arrest barrier which in turn destroys reality in a blinding flash.

"Part Two: Reality Television"
A television writer Gavin is trying to get his pilot produced. He leaves home to work on his TV show, Knowing, about a mother and daughter who are lost, which stars his friend Melissa McCarthy as the lead actress. In a conversation about reviews and critics Susan, a television executive and producer of the show, tells Gavin to look for the nines, which he then writes on a piece of paper, the same piece that Gary found in Part One. He also tells Melissa that he thinks he is haunted by himself. During the process of post-production, Susan pushes for Gavin to ditch his friend Melissa as the unconventional lead of his project in favor of a more attractive, well-known actress. This causes an argument between him and Melissa. He then finds out that the well-known actress was actually cast in another show, which Susan knew before suggesting her. Since the well-known actress is now unavailable, and Melissa won't answer Gavin's calls, he confronts Susan about her knowing that his show would never get picked up and about him only being a subject on a reality television show. After a heated exchange, he snaps and slaps her. Seemingly insulting his manhood for hitting a woman, she scoffs: "Do you feel like a man?" and walks away, which leads to him telling the reality TV cameraman to leave him alone. A pedestrian then asks him to whom he is talking, and it is shown that the reality television cameraman does not exist. He looks around and notices that everyone has a "7" floating above their heads and also that he has a "9" floating above his own.

A flashback shows Gary's P.R. handler, Margaret, telling him that he is God, a nine like the angels, and humans are sevens (koalas, incidentally, are eights because they control weather). He created the world and can destroy it with a single thought. He exists in many different forms and that none of them are real. Gary does not believe this and becomes distraught, which is revealed to be the real reason for his breaking his house arrest barrier.

"Part Three: Knowing"
Acclaimed video game designer Gabriel, whose car breaks down in the middle of nowhere, leaves his wife, Mary, and young daughter, Noelle, to try to get a better signal on his phone. He meets a woman, Sierra, who leads him off into the woods to her car, so she can give him a lift to the gas station. Meanwhile, back at the car Noelle watches a video on a digital camera showing Gavin talking to Melissa from Part Two and Margaret talking to Gary in Part One. She is confused and shows her mom, who appears confused as well.

Meanwhile, Gabriel becomes ill because Sierra has drugged his water with GHB. In all of the stories, as Sarah, Sierra and Susan, she has been trying to separate him from Mary/Melissa/Margaret and make him realize that none of these lives are real. She says that this is an intervention, and she and the other recurring characters have been trying to help him remember that he is not human, but God, who has absorbed himself in various human incarnations for 4000 years. She likens Gabriel's addiction to video game addiction. He is needed back home, a place that cannot be imagined with human thoughts or described in human words.

Gabriel returns to the car and the family goes home. Mary deduces that Gabriel has remembered his reality and needs to leave. Gabriel tells her that there were ninety different variations of the universe, and this is the last one. Gabriel removes the green string from his wrist and the universe morphs into something else. The film ends with Melissa McCarthy's character married to Ben, to whom she had been married in Part Two, with Noelle as their daughter. Noelle tells her mother that "He's not coming back" and that "He put all the pieces together", and her mother finishes her sentence that this is "the best of all possible worlds."

Cast
 Ryan Reynolds as Gary, a troubled actor / Gavin, a TV writer / and Gabriel, a Computer-Game designer
 Melissa McCarthy as Margaret, Gary's PR handler / herself, an actress in Gavin's TV show / and Mary, Gabriel's wife.
 Hope Davis as Sarah, Gary's Neighbor / Susan, a TV executive for Gavin / and Sierra, a mysterious woman who tries to help Gabriel
 Elle Fanning as Noelle
 David Denman as Parole Officer / Agitated Man 
 Octavia Spencer as Streetwalker

Production
According to August, the film was inspired by his experiences on his TV series D.C.. He developed the script further over the years, partially making it a quasi-sequel to his short film God (also featuring Melissa McCarthy). The movie was shot over 22 days in Los Angeles and two days in New York, with some scenes in John August's house. The movie was shot in a combination of video and film with everything being posted in high-definition.

Soundtrack
 "You Keep Me Hangin' On" Performed by The Ferris Wheel
 "Trucha" Performed by Ghostman MC
 "Alive Transmission" Performed by The Shys
 "Hang On Little Tomato" Performed by Pink Martini
 "Is That All There Is" Performed by Hope Davis
 "Paper Plane" Performed by Persephone's Bees
 "Teenage Villain" Written by Keith Mansfield
 "Bang Bang to the Rock 'N' Roll" Performed by Gabin
 "Comet Samba" Performed by Cabaret Diosa
 "Monokini Ou Bikini" Performed by Georges Deligny
 "Romantico Bosanova" Written by Philippe Bestion
 "As Long as He Needs Me" Performed by Melissa McCarthy
 "Multiply" Performed by Jamie Lidell
 "Sugar Town" Performed by Juliet Turner
 "Myopia" Performed by The Skeem
 "Tears Coming Home" Performed by Sébastien Schuller
 "Chopin Nocturne 1, Opus 32" Performed by Danielle Luppi
 "The Other Side of Mt. Heart Attack" Performed by Liars
 "The Finish Line" Performed by Snow Patrol

Reception

On Rotten Tomatoes the film has an approval rating of 65% based on 60 reviews, with an average critical rating of 5.93/10. On Metacritic, the film has a weighted average score of 52 out of 100, indicating "mixed or average reviews", based on 12 reviews: 6 positive, 3 mixed, and 3 negative.

Dennis Harvey of Variety wrote: "The Nines arcs from witty Hollywood insiderdom to a climactic metaphysical leap that may leave many viewers nonplussed. Nonetheless, there's more than enough intelligence, intrigue and performance dazzle to make this an adventuresome gizmo for grownups."

Accolades
34th Saturn Awards
Nomination:
 Best DVD release

References

External links
 
 

2007 films
2000s psychological drama films
2007 fantasy films
2000s mystery films
2007 psychological thriller films
2007 science fiction films
American fantasy films
American science fiction films
American mystery films
American thriller films
American psychological drama films
American nonlinear narrative films
American anthology films
Films scored by Alex Wurman
Films set in Los Angeles
Films shot in Los Angeles
Films about dysfunctional families
Films about religion
Films about television
Films with screenplays by John August
2007 directorial debut films
2007 independent films
2007 drama films
2000s English-language films
Films produced by Bruce Cohen
2000s American films